"We Belong Together" is a 2005 song by Mariah Carey.

We Belong Together may refer to:

Music
 "We Belong Together" (Robert & Johnny song) (1958).
 "We Belong Together", a 1973 song by the Spinners from Spinners.
 "We Belong Together", a 1981 song by Rickie Lee Jones from Pirates.
 "We Belong Together", a 1998 song by Tony Thompson and Antoinette from the Down in the Delta film soundtrack.
 "We Belong Together", a 2004 song by Kate Ryan from Stronger.
 "We Belong Together" (Big Bang song) (2006).
 "We Belong Together", a 2008 song by Gavin DeGraw from Gavin DeGraw.
 "We Belong Together" (Randy Newman song) (2010).
 "We Belong Together", a 2019 song by Vampire Weekend from Father of the Bride.

Other
 We Belong Together, a campaign for immigration reform in the US
 2014 season 5 episode of Teen Mom 2

See also
 We Belong (disambiguation)